The gens Egnatuleia was a plebeian family at ancient Rome.  The only member of the gens to achieve any of the higher offices of the state was Lucius Egnatuleius, quaestor in 44 BC.

Members
This list includes abbreviated praenomina. For an explanation of this practice, see filiation.

 Gaius Egnatuleius, father of the triumvir monetalis.
 Gaius Egnatuleius C. f., triumvir monetalis in 97 BC.  He struck a quinarius bearing the head of Apollo on the obverse, and Victoria with a trophy on the reverse.
 Lucius Egnatuleius, quaestor in 44 BC.  He commanded the fourth legion, which deserted from Marcus Antonius to Octavian.  As a reward for his conduct on this occasion, Cicero proposed in the senate that he should be allowed to hold public offices three years before the legal time.
 Egnatuleius Crescens, legate of Numidia under Magnentius.
 (? Egn)atuleius Herculius, praefectus annonae under Magnus Maximus.

See also
 List of Roman gentes

References

 
 PLRE – 

Roman gentes